The Scenic Bridge crossing Clark Fork River about  east of Tarkio in Mineral County, Montana, was built in 1928. It is located at Milepost 0 on Old U.S. Route 10 West. The bridge has also been denoted 24MN304 and MDT No. L31012000+08. It was listed on the National Register of Historic Places in 2010.

The bridge is a riveted Pratt deck truss bridge constructed in 1928. It has three main spans upon reinforced concrete abutments and piers.

This Pratt deck truss design is visually pleasing and rare. It was chosen by state staff for relatively rare circumstances during 1928 to 1932, after which a version of a Warren truss design was used.

See also
List of bridges documented by the Historic American Engineering Record in Montana
List of bridges on the National Register of Historic Places in Montana

References

External links

Road bridges on the National Register of Historic Places in Montana
Bridges completed in 1928
Steel bridges in the United States
Pratt truss bridges in the United States
Historic American Engineering Record in Montana
National Register of Historic Places in Mineral County, Montana